A kitchen is a room used for the preparation of food.

Kitchen, or The Kitchen, may also refer to:

Arts and entertainment

Films
 Kitchen (1966 film), an American film
 Kitchen (1997 film), a Hong Kong film
 The Kitchen (1961 film), a British drama
 The Kitchen (2012 film), an American comedy-drama
 The Kitchen (2019 film), an American crime drama

Television
 Kitchen (TV series) or Кухня, a 2012 Russian TV series
 The Kitchen (talk show), a 2014 American cooking-themed talk show

Other uses in arts and entertainment
 Kitchen (novel), a 1988 novel by Japanese author Banana Yoshimoto
 The Kitchen (play), a 1957 play by Arnold Wesker
 The Kitchen (album), a 2013 album by Hieroglyphics
 The Kitchen (performance venue), a performance venue and art space in New York City

Places

Communities
 Kitchen, Ohio, an unincorporated community in Jackson County
 Kitchen, West Virginia, an unincorporated community in Logan County

Restaurants
 The Kitchen (California restaurant), a Michelin-starred restaurant in Sacramento, California
 The Kitchen, a South African restaurant owned by Karen Dudley
 The Kitchen, a restaurant chain co-founded by Kimbal Musk

Other uses 
 Kitchen (surname), for people named Kitchen
 Kitchen, African American nickname for hair at the nape
 Kitchen, an advertising agency co-founded by Anne Gravingen and Bendik Romstad and now a unit of Leo Burnett Worldwide
 Kitchen, the NATO reporting name for the Soviet/Russian Kh-22 Raduga anti-ship missile
 Kitchen, the Non-volley zone in the game of pickleball

See also
 Kitchen Creek (disambiguation)
 Kitchin (disambiguation)